Provincial Archives can be:
 Archives of Manitoba, Winnipeg, Manitoba, Canada
 Archives of Ontario, Toronto, Ontario, Canada
 Bibliothèque et Archives nationales du Québec, multiple sites
 National and Provincial State Archives (Belgium)
 Nova Scotia Archives and Records Management, formerly the Public Archives of Nova Scotia, Halifax, Nova Scotia, Canada
 Provincial Archives of Newfoundland and Labrador, St. John's, Newfoundland and Labrador, Canada
 Provincial Archives of Alberta, Edmonton, Alberta, Canada
 Provincial Archives of Funen, in Odense, Denmark
 Provincial Archives of New Brunswick, New Brunswick, Canada
 Public Archives and Records Office (Prince Edward Island), Prince Edward Island, Canada
 Royal British Columbia Museum, which absorbed the former British Columbia Provincial Archives, Victoria, British Columbia, Canada
 Saskatchewan Archives Board, Saskatoon and Regina, Saskatchewan, Canada
 The Provincial Archives of Östergötland, Sweden, housed in Vadstena Castle

See also
 The Provincial Archive, Canadian rock band